The Subhas Chandra Bose statue located in Shyambazar five point crossing is one of the most important statues and landmarks in Kolkata. The statue was sculpted by Nagesh Yoglekar and was unveiled by Kolkata Municipal Corporation in 1969.

History 
The statue was sculpted by Nagesh Yoglekar and was unveiled by Kolkata Municipal Corporation in 1969. In 2008, during a project initiated by Hooghly River Bridge Commissioners (HRBC), this statue and its surrounding area were beautified. At this time the statue was painted and illuminated by two lamp posts.

Description 
The statue depicts Bose, wearing military attire seated on a horse with one leg up. The statue itself acts as an important visual landmark for the local community to aid in navigation.

See also 
 Statue of Subhas Chandra Bose

References 

Culture of Kolkata
Memorials to Subhas Chandra Bose
Colossal statues in India
Equestrian statues in India
Statues of activists
Statues of politicians
Outdoor sculptures in India
1969 sculptures
1969 establishments in West Bengal